Laminacauda baerti is a species of sheet weaver found in Colombia, Panama, and the Galapagos Islands. It was described by Miller in 2007.

References

Linyphiidae
Spiders described in 2007
Spiders of South America